translated as Beetle, the Horn King is a 2005 Japanese film directed by Minoru Kawasaki. The film, from an original story by Go Nagai and a screenplay by Takao Nakano, is based on the character of the same name created by Nagai for Osaka Pro-Wrestling (Ōsaka Puroresu).

External links
Kabuto-O Beetle  official website
 
Beetle, the Horn King at allmovie
Kabuto-O Beetle  at allcinema

2005 films
2000s Japanese-language films
Films directed by Minoru Kawasaki
Films about insects
Go Nagai
2000s Japanese films